Mak may refer to:

People
Mak Dizdar (1917 - 1971), Bosnian poet
Muhammad Arshad Khan, Pakistani painter popularly known as "MAK"
Alan Mak (director) (born 1968), Hong Kong film director
Alan Mak (politician) (born 1984), British Member of Parliament
Alice Mak, Chinese cartoonist and creator of McMug/McDull
Geert Mak, Dutch journalist, historian, and author
Róbert Mak, Slovak football player
Mai (Chinese surname), transliterated as "Mak" in Cantonese

Places
Mak, Kardzhali Province, village in Bulgaria
 Mak, Masovian Voivodeship, village in Poland
 Museum of Applied Arts, Vienna, Museum in Vienna, Austria

Other
 The Mak language of Guizhou, China
 The Mak language of Nigeria
 Ma. K., abbreviation for the science-fiction universe Maschinen Krieger ZbV 3000
 Maksutov telescope, catadioptric telescope invented by Dmitri Maksutov
 MaK (Maschinenbau Kiel), German engineering firm in Kiel
 Mouvement pour l'Autonomie de la Kabylie, Kabyle (Berber) political movement seeking self-government rule in Algeria
 Mak, alternative spelling of makk, a Sudanic royal title

See also

Mahk
Makh
MaK
MAK (disambiguation)
MAKS (disambiguation)
Makk (disambiguation)
Mac (disambiguation)
Mach (disambiguation)
Mack (disambiguation)
Mark (disambiguation)